Neau is a commune in the Mayenne department in north-western France.

See also
 Communes of Mayenne

References

External links
 Government website

Communes of Mayenne